The 2012 PBA Commissioner's Cup Finals was the best-of-7 championship series of the Philippine Basketball Association (PBA) 2012 Commissioner's Cup, and the conclusion of the conference's playoffs. The Talk 'N Text Tropang Texters and the B-Meg Llamados played for the 105th championship contested by the league.

Background

Road to the finals

Series summary
*overtime

Game 1

Game 2

Game 3

Game 4

Game 5

Game 6

Game 7

Rosters

Broadcast notes

Additional Game 7 crew:
Trophy presentation: Aaron Atayde
Dugout interviewer: Erika Padilla

References

External links
PBA official website

2011–12 PBA season
2012
TNT Tropang Giga games
Magnolia Hotshots games
PBA Commissioner's Cup Finals
PBA Commissioner's Cup Finals